Chashma Barrage is a barrage on the River Indus in Mianwali District of the Punjab province of Pakistan 304 km NW of Lahore and 56 km downstream of Jinnah Barrage. The contract for Chashma Barrage works was awarded on 10 February 1967 to French Consortium Société Dumez and Société Borie and was successfully completed by 25 March 1971. The total cost of Chashma Barrage works was Rs.399 million but power generation started later in 2001. The installed capacity of power Station is 184 MW, from eight Kaplan-type bulb turbine units, each with a 23 MW capacity. The bulb turbines have been installed for the first time in Pakistan. The first unit was commissioned in January 2001, while final commissioning of all units was completed in July 2001. The 8 Kaplan-type turbines and synchronous generator units were made by Fuji, Japan.

Chashma Barrage is used for irrigation, flood control and power generation. A Ramsar site is located nearby.

Salient features
Length between abutments: 3556 ft.
Total Bays: 52 
Standard Bays: 41 
Undersluce Bays: 11 
Normal Pond Level: 642 ft 
Maximum Storage Level: 649 ft.  
Maximum Flood Discharge: 950000 Cusecs 
Maximum Intensity of Discharge: 300Cs. Per ft. 
Width of Carriage Way: 24 ft. 
Length of Navigation Lock: 155 ft. 
Width of Navigation Lock: 30 ft. 
Area of Reservoir: 139 square metres. 
Initial Capacity: 0.87 MAF 
Contract Price: Rs 399 Million 
Date Commencement: 10 February 1967 
Date of Completion: 25 March 1971
Contractor: Societe Dumes Enterprises Borie of France 
Consulting Engineer:  COODE & Partner London

See also
 List of barrages and headworks in Pakistan
 List of dams and reservoirs in Pakistan
 List of power stations in Pakistan

References

Dams in Pakistan
Hydroelectric power stations in Pakistan
Ramsar sites in Pakistan
Irrigation in Pakistan
Mianwali District
Dams on the Indus River